Michael Pollard may be:
 Michael J. Pollard (1939–2019), American actor
 Michael Pollard (cricketer) (born 1989), New Zealand cricketer